Babeyevo is a village (selo) in Temnikovsky District of the Republic of Mordovia, Russia.

References

Rural localities in Mordovia
Temnikovsky District
Temnikovsky Uyezd